Delmer Edward Young (May 11, 1912 in Cleveland, Ohio – December 8, 1979 in San Francisco, California) was a professional baseball player. Young played in four Major League Baseball seasons, all with the Philadelphia Phillies. His father, Delmar John Young, also played in Major League Baseball.

A middle infielder, Young played 148 games at shortstop and 147 at second base. He also had an extensive career in minor league baseball spanning seventeen seasons from 1931–47. He played the final five seasons of his career with the San Francisco Seals of the Pacific Coast League, although he played only sparingly the last two.

See also
List of second-generation Major League Baseball players

External links

Major League Baseball infielders
Philadelphia Phillies players
Burlington Bees players
Fort Wayne Chiefs players
Beckley Black Knights players
Elmira Red Wings players
Albany Senators players
Harrisburg Senators players
Oklahoma City Indians players
Jersey City Giants players
Hollywood Stars players
San Francisco Seals (baseball) players
Baseball players from Cleveland
1912 births
1979 deaths